Luciano Silva Santos (born 26 February 2003), simply known as Luciano, is a Brazilian footballer who plays as a midfielder for Red Bull Bragantino.

Club career
Luciano represented , Goiás and Desportivo Brasil before joining Red Bull Bragantino in 2021,  initially on loan. He made his senior debut with reserve team Red Bull Brasil on 20 April of that year, in a 0–4 Campeonato Paulista Série A2 away loss against Oeste, and scored his first goal on 9 May in a 1–0 away win over Portuguesa.

Luciano made his first team – and Série A – debut for Braga on 17 October 2021, coming on as a second-half substitute for Emiliano Martínez in a 2–2 away draw against Ceará. The following January, he agreed to a permanent deal until 2026.

Career statistics

References

External links
Red Bull Bragantino profile 

2003 births
Living people
Brazilian footballers
Association football midfielders
Campeonato Brasileiro Série A players
Red Bull Brasil players
Red Bull Bragantino players